The BA-27 was a Soviet first series-produced armoured car, manufactured from 1928 to 1931, and used for scouting and infantry support duties early in the Second World War. The BA-27 was a heavy armoured car, having the same turret and armament as the first Soviet tank, T-18, manufactured at the same time: the main gun was a modified copy of the French 37 mm Puteaux SA 18 cannon, and it was supported by an additional machine gun.

The production of the first Soviet truck, AMO-F-15 truck (a copy of the Fiat 15), started in 1924. Using the chassis of this truck, the Izhorsky Factory design team developed BA-27 heavy armoured car in 1927. There was no significant production of AFVs in Russia since 1918, and the indigenous automobile industry was practically non-existent at the time. After lengthy trials, the new vehicle was accepted into Soviet Red Army service in 1929. 215 were built between 1928–31. The last batch of BA-27 was mounted on Ford Model AA truck chassis. Both chassis were found to be inadequate to carry the heavy armour, and around 20 were later rebuilt on heavier, three-axle Ford-Timken truck chassis at Repair Base No. 2 (Rembaz No. 2), bearing designation BA-27M.

193 of BA-27 and BA-27M still remained in service on 1 June 1941, just before the German invasion of the Soviet Union. During the early stages of the war, several units were captured by Germans and pressed into their own service.

References 

 Zaloga, Steven J., James Grandsen (1984). Soviet Tanks and Combat Vehicles of World War Two, London: Arms and Armour Press. .

World War II armoured cars
World War II armoured fighting vehicles of the Soviet Union
Military vehicles introduced in the 1920s